Altay is a rural locality (a settlement) and the administrative center of Obsky Selsoviet of Kalmansky District, Altai Krai, Russia. The population was 883 as of 2016. There are 13 streets.

Geography 
Altay is located on the right bank of the Marushka River, 23 km northwest of Kalmanka (the district's administrative centre) by road. Alexandrovka is the nearest rural locality.

Ethnicity 
The settlement is inhabited by Russians and others.

References 

Rural localities in Kalmansky District